Salwa (also written as Śalva [Shalva]) is a kingdom grouped among the western kingdoms in the epic Mahabharata. It was close to Madra Kingdom as both are mentioned together in many places. Saubha was its capital. Martikavati (alias Matika, Matrika, Matrikavati) also was mentioned as the capital of Salwa kingdom. The famous prince Satyavan was from Salwa. He married the Madra princess, Savitri, the daughter of Madra king Aswapati. Their history is a famous narration in Mahabharata. Seven chapters 3:291 to 3:297 is dedicated to this history of Satyavan and Savitri.

References in Mahabharata

The common ancestry of Salwas and Madras
There was, in ancient times, a king in the race of Puru, known by the name of Vyushitaswa. He was devoted to truth and virtue. Vyushitaswa, who was endued with the strength of ten elephants very soon performed the horse-sacrifice, overthrowing, all the kings of the East, the North, the West and the South, and exacted tributes from them all. The seven children all of whom became king, three Salwas and four Madras were sons of Vyushitaswa. (1:121).

Location of Salwa Kingdom
Salwa kingdom is mentioned very close to Madra kingdom at (6:9) which describe kingdoms of Bharata Varsha. Another kingdom named Salwasena is mentioned close to Trigarta Kingdom. The Matsyas, the Panchalas, the Salways and the Surasenas were mentioned as not very far away from Kuru Kingdom at (5:54). King Jayadratha of Sauvira Kingdom is mentioned as travelling to Salwa Kingdom through Kamyaka woods. (3:262).

Salwa culture
Salwas were included in the kingdoms that falls in the larger circle of the mainstream culture propounded by the Kurus and Panchalas

The Kauravas with the Pancalas, the Salwas, the Matsyas, the Naimishas, the Koshalas, the Kasapaundras, the Kalingas, the Magadhas, and the Cedis who are all highly blessed, know what the eternal religion is. (8:45).

King Dyumatsena of Salwa
Dyumatsena was the father of Satyavan, the famous prince who wedded the Madra princess Savitri.  Section 3:292 describes the history of Dyumatsena:-

There was, amongst the Salwas, a virtuous Kshatriya king known by the name of Dyumatsena. And it came to pass that in course of time he became blind.  And that blind king possessed of wisdom had an only son.  And it so happened that an old enemy dwelling in the vicinity, taking advantage of the king's mishap, deprived him of his kingdom.  And thereupon the monarch, accompanied by his wife bearing a child on her breast, went into the woods.  His son, born in the city, began to grow in the hermitage.  The Brahmanas have named the son Satyavan. In his childhood he took great delight in horses, and used to make horses of clay. And he used also to draw pictures of horses.  And for this that youth is sometimes called by the name of Chitraswa. The Madra princess Savitri knew about this prince and fell in love with him. Later she married him. Dyumatsena's minister somehow slew the enemy king and Dyumatesena regained his kingdom.

Salwa king contemporary to Bhishma
A Salwa king named Shalva Kumara (5:179) was mentioned as a lover of Amba, the eldest princess of Kasi Kingdom, who was abducted by Bhishma, a warrior from Kuru Kingdom, along with her sisters Ambika and Ambalika.  Bhishma wished to  make her the wife of Kuru prince Vichitravirya, but Amba wished to marry the Salwa king.  Bhishma sent her to Salwa but the Salwa king rejected her.

Salwa king contemporary to Krishna

Yet another Salwa king (3:12, 7:11) attacked Dwaraka, this Salwa king was an ally of Shishupala, Dantavakra and Rukmi.  According to the narration in the epic, he possessed an aircraft known as Saubha Vimana and used it for travel and for aerial warfare.
In detail, according to mahabharata, when Krishna had gone for Pandavas Rajasuya, king of Saubha attacked his city Dwarawati. To encounter him, Samva, Charudeshna, Pradyumna(Rukmani son) came out. They speedily defeated enemy commander and made him flee the battle, and killed all of the Danavas aiding him in battle by fiery weapons. To fight enemy king, Krishna son Pradyumna challenged him. They first commenced an aerial battle and later for better encounter descended from their cars. They both started to pierce each other with greater weapons making other unconscious each time. At last when about to be killed, King Salwa retreated from battle. When Krishna returned, he found his city gardens and damsels devoid of beauty. Upon knowing everything that had happened, he promised them to slay his enemy.
Krishna with his army marched for the attack and found King Salwa in an island pursuiting ocean coarse. And when battle began, both side started to shower arrows upon each other. Krishna started to kill all the Danavas aiding to the latter side. Seeing his side at loss, Salwa used an illusion causing enemy heroes to get confused of the environment and killed Krishna charioteer. And also made Vasudeva to get stuck in his illusion causing him to desist from fight. Later concluding in his mind that it was illusion he recovered his senses and started to fight afresh by discharging fiery weapons. Seeing this opponent Danavas showered mighty rocks upon them killing Krishna steeds but Krishna destroyed their shower by using thunderbolt as his weapon. At last, Krishna hurled his powerful discus Sudarshana and killed all the remaining tribes including Salwa. Killing everyone at the lord command it returned to Krishna. (See Dwaraka Kingdom for more details).

Impact of Magadha over Salwa
The eighteen tribes of the Bhojas, from fear of Magadha king Jarasandha, have all fled towards the west; so also have the Surasenas, the Bhadrakas, the Vodhas, the Salwas, the Patachchavas, the Susthalas, the Mukuttas, and the Kulindas, along with the Kuntis. And the king of the Salwayana tribe with their brethren and followers; and the southern Panchalas and the eastern Kosalas have all fled to the country of the Kuntis. (2:14).

Salwas in Kurukshetra War
A Salwa king allied with Duryodhana in Kurukshetra War (5:161). At (9:20) his final battle against the Pandavas is mentioned. A Salwa king has sided with Pandavas too in the Kurukshetra War. (7:23) Bhimaratha, (brother of Duryodhana), with six sharp shafts of great swiftness and made wholly of iron, despatched Salwa along with his steeds and charioteer to Yama’s abode. Salwakas along with Malavakas were mentioned as allies of the Pandavas ( 5:57).  At (5:30) Salwakas were mentioned as fighting for Kauravas.

Other cultural references
Son of Salwa is mentioned as present in the self choice ceremony at Panchala Kingdom. (5:4)
The Salwa prince Dyutimat of great splendour attained to the highest regions by giving his kingdom to Richika. (13:137) (12,233).

See also
Kingdoms of Ancient India

References

Sources
Mahabharata of Krishna Dwaipayana Vyasa, translated to English by Kisari Mohan Ganguli

Kingdoms in the Mahabharata